The 2018 United States House of Representatives elections in Utah were held on November 6, 2018, to elect the four U.S. representatives from the state of Utah, one from each of the state's four congressional districts. The elections coincided with other states' elections to the House of Representatives, elections to the United States Senate and various state and local elections. Registered political parties in Utah must have at least one of their candidates for House of Representatives get 2% of the vote in their respective election in order to maintain their ballot access in future elections.

The Democratic Party gained the 4th Congressional district, thus breaking unitary control of all of Utah's Congressional (House and Senate) seats held by the Republicans, changing the House delegation from Utah from 4–0 Republican to 3–1 Republican. As of 2022, this is the last time a Democrat won any house race in Utah.

Overview

Results of the 2018 United States House of Representatives elections in Utah by district:

District 1

The 1st District covers northern Utah, including the cities of Ogden and Logan. Republican Rob Bishop, who has represented the district since 2003, was re-elected to an eighth term with 66% of the vote in 2016.

The 1st District went for Donald Trump in the 2016 presidential election, with 49.7%, with Hillary Clinton and Evan McMullin receiving 22.4% and 22.3% respectively. In 2012 the district went for Mitt Romney over Barack Obama 77.4% to 20.4%.

Republican primary

Candidates

Declared
 Rob Bishop, incumbent U.S. representative

Eliminated at Convention
 Kevin Probasco, attorney and author

Democratic primary

Candidates

Declared
 Lee Castillo, social worker, former board member of the Stonewall Utah Democrats
 Kurt Weiland, President and CEO of Jefferson Smith training and Consulting since 1996

Results

United Utah Party

Candidates

Declared
 Eric Eliason, businessman, attorney, and adjunct professor

Green Party

Candidates

Declared
 Adam Davis

General election

Polling

Results

District 2

The 2nd District stretches from the Summit County, Utah line and goes west to the Nevada border and down through St. George. It includes parts of Davis, Salt Lake, Sanpete, and Juab Counties.  Republican Chris Stewart, who has represented the district since 2013, was re-elected to a third term with 62% of the vote in 2016

The 2nd District went for Donald Trump in the 2016 presidential election, with 46%, with Hillary Clinton and Evan McMullin receiving 32% and 16.9% respectively. In 2012 the district went for Mitt Romney over Barack Obama 68% to 29.2%.

Republican primary

Candidates

Declared
 Chris Stewart, incumbent U.S. representative

Eliminated at Convention
 Mary Burkett, a businesswoman and former vice chair of the Washington County Republican Party, formed an exploratory committee for a potential primary challenge of Stewart.
 Ken Clark

Democratic primary

Candidates

Declared
 Shireen Ghorbani, communications professional

Eliminated at Convention
 Randy Hopkins

Withdrew
 Misty K. Snow, nominee for U.S. Senate in 2016

United Utah Party

Candidates

Declared
 Jan Garbett

Libertarian Party

Candidates

Declared
 Jeffrey Whipple

General election

Polling

Results

District 3

The 3rd district is located in southern and eastern Utah and includes the cities of Orem and Provo.  Republican John Curtis, who has represented the district since 2017, was elected to his first term in a 2017 special election with 57.6% of the vote.

The 3rd District went for Donald Trump in the 2016 presidential election, with 47.2%, with Evan McMullin and Hillary Clinton receiving 24.5% and 23.3% respectively. In 2012 the district went for Mitt Romney over Barack Obama 78.3% to 19.5%.

Republican primary

Candidates

Declared
John Curtis, incumbent U.S. representative

Eliminated at Convention
Damian Kidd, attorney

Declined
Jason Chaffetz, former U.S. representative
Evan McMullin, retired CIA officer and independent candidate for U.S. President in 2016
Deidre Henderson, state senator
Curt Bramble, state senator
Mike McKell, state representative

Polling

Results

Democratic primary

Candidates

Declared
James Singer, college professor

Eliminated at convention
 Kent Moon

Withdrew
Kathryn Allen, physician
Ben Frank

General election

Polling

Results

District 4

The 4th district is located in northern-central Utah and includes parts of Salt Lake, Utah, Juab, and Sanpete Counties. Republican Mia Love, who has represented the district since 2015, was re-elected to a second term with 54% of the vote in 2016.

Salt Lake County Mayor Ben McAdams was selected in the Democratic primary.

The 4th District voted for Donald Trump in the 2016 presidential election, with 39.1%, with Hillary Clinton and Evan McMullin receiving 32.4% and 22.5% respectively. In 2012, the district voted for Mitt Romney over Barack Obama 67.2% to 30.2%.

Republican primary

Candidates

Declared
 Mia Love, incumbent U.S. representative

Democratic primary

Candidates

Declared
 Ben McAdams, mayor of Salt Lake County

Eliminated at Convention
 Sheldon Kirkham
 Darlene McDonald, author and activist
 Morgan Shepherd
 Tom Taylor, engineer and scientist

General election

Debates
Complete video of debate, October 15, 2018

Polling
Graphical summary

Results

References

External links
Candidates at Vote Smart 
Candidates at Ballotpedia 
Campaign finance at FEC 
Campaign finance at OpenSecrets

Official campaign websites of first district candidates
Rob Bishop (R) for Congress
Lee Castillo (D) for Congress 
Adam Davis (G) for Congress
Eric Eliason (UU) for Congress

Official campaign websites of second district candidates
Shireen Ghorbani (D) for Congress
Chris Stewart (R) for Congress
Jeffrey Whipple (L) for Congress

Official campaign websites of third district candidates
John Curtis (R) for Congress
Gregory Duerden (I) for Congress
James Singer (D) for Congress
Timothy Zeidner (UU) for Congress

Official campaign websites of fourth district candidates
Ben McAdams (D) for Congress
Mia Love (R) for Congress

2018
Utah
United States House of Representatives